Coluzea eastwoodae is a species of large sea snail, marine gastropod mollusk in the family Columbariidae.

References

Columbariidae
Gastropods described in 1971